Vojens Airport, also known as Skrydstrup Airport is an airport in Vojens, Denmark. It shares runways with Fighter Wing Skrydstrup.

References

Airports in Denmark
Transport in the Region of Southern Denmark
Buildings and structures in the Region of Southern Denmark